The women's 10 metre platform, also called high diving, was one of four diving events on the Diving at the 1952 Summer Olympics programme.

The competition was held from both 10 and 5 metre platforms and was split into two phases on different days:

Preliminary round (1 August) – Divers performed four voluntary dives of limited degrees of difficulty. The eight divers with the highest scores advanced to the final.
Final (2 August) – Divers performed two voluntary dives without any limits of difficulty. The final score was the aggregate of the preliminary and final rounds' points.

Results

References

Sources
 
 

Women
1952
1952 in women's diving
Div